Our Best Of is the third greatest hits album by the Australian power pop group, Sunnyboys. The album comprises 16 remastered tracks, hand-picked by the band as well as previously unreleased material including a pre-debut album demo.
and was released in December 2013.

In March 2014, the album was supported by a national tour; the band's first run of headline dates since 1991.

Background
In April 2012, 1980s alternative rock band Sunnyboys reformed as part of the Hoodoo Gurus' "Dig It Up!" festival, which led to a sold-out performance at the Sydney Opera House in June 2013. This led to the release of Our Best Of and an accompanying headline tour.

Reception
i94 Bar said "There have been Sunnyboys compilations before and they've been of varying excellence... Our Best views the recording history squarely from the band members' own perspective, ups the stakes sonically with some re-mastering tweaks and throws in demo/alternative mix material plus a live track", adding "There aren't many surprises, but what's here works well - and thus it's a great starting point for the uninitiated and a must for completists."

Track listing

Release history

References

2013 greatest hits albums
Festival Records albums
Warner Records albums
Sunnyboys albums
Compilation albums by Australian artists